Human consumption may refer to:

 Anthropophagy (disambiguation), the consumption of humans
 Consumption (economics), consumption of goods by humans
 Consumer (food chain), consumption of other organisms by humans
 Consumption (sociology)
 Tuberculosis, historically called consumption